Ahmed Raouf Mohamed Adam (born 15 September 1982) is a retired Egyptian footballer.

Raouf was included in the Egypt national football team that participated in 2009 FIFA Confederations Cup and won the 2010 Africa Cup of Nations. He played 5 matches in FIFA World Cup 2010 Qualifiers.

Honours
 Winner of African Cup of Nations Angola 2010
 Winner of Egypt Cup (2011) playing for ENPPI

References

External links

Ahmed Raouf at Footballdatabase

1982 births
Living people
Egyptian footballers
Egypt international footballers
2009 FIFA Confederations Cup players
2010 Africa Cup of Nations players
ENPPI SC players
Al Ahly SC players
Al Masry SC players
Smouha SC players
Wadi Degla SC players
Petrojet SC players
El Entag El Harby SC players
Footballers from Cairo
Association football forwards
Egyptian Premier League players
Al-Ittihad Club (Tripoli) players
Expatriate footballers in Libya
Egyptian expatriate footballers
Egyptian expatriate sportspeople in Libya
El Qanah FC players
El Minya SC players